Kitty Aldridge (born 9 May 1962) is a British actress and writer.

Life and career
Aldridge was born in Bahrain. After training as an actress at the Drama Centre London, Aldridge went on to work in film, theatre and television as an actress for 15 years. In her thirties she began to write fiction. Her first novel, Pop, published in 2001, was longlisted for the Orange Prize for Fiction 2002 and shortlisted for the Pendleton May First Novel Award 2002. Her second novel, Cryers Hill, was published in March 2007.

Aldridge's short story, Arrivederci Les, won the Bridport Short Story Prize 2011.

Her third novel, A Trick I Learned from Dead Men, was published in 2012. It was longlisted for the 2013 Baileys Women's Prize for Fiction and The Guardian newspaper's Not The Booker Prize 2012.

Aldridge’s new novel, The Wisdom of Bones, was published in May 2019.

Aldridge married the former guitarist frontman of Dire Straits Mark Knopfler on Valentine's Day 1997 in Barbados. They have two daughters.

Filmography

Film

Television

Bibliography
Pop, Cape (Vintage); (2001) 
Cryers Hill, Cape (Vintage); (1 March 2007) 
Arrivederci Les; (2011)
A Trick I Learned from Dead Men, Cape (Vintage); (5 July 2012) 
The Wisdom of Bones, Corsair (Little, Brown); (May 2, 2019)

Awards
  Bridport Short Story Prize 2011

References

External links

 
Filmography at the New York Times
Aitken Alexander Associates Limited
Random House Group, UK
Kitty Aldridge, Interview, The Guardian

1962 births
Living people
Alumni of the Drama Centre London
British film actresses
British television actresses
British expatriates in Bahrain
20th-century British actresses
20th-century British novelists